Spiridon Gopčević (junior), pen name Leo Brenner (9 July 1855 – 1928) was a Serbian-Austrian astronomer and historian born in Trieste.

Life
He was named after his father, Spiridon, who was a great shipowner in Trieste, then Austrian Littoral (modern Italy), but had originated from the village of Podi near Herceg Novi, in Boka Kotorska (modern Montenegro), then a part of the Austrian Empire. After the death of his father, when Spiridon was a boy, he was sent to Vienna to be educated. He attended the Theresianum (1861-1865) and Stiftsgymnasium Melk (1865-1869) at Melk in Austria. Following the death of his mother, he became a journalist by trade. He regarded himself first and foremost as a Serb, and that drove him to participate in the 1875 uprising in Herzegovina, and the following year to witness the Montenegrin-Ottoman War (1876-78), and participate in an insurrection in 1882 against the Habsburgs in southern Dalmatia, where he was arrested with Arthur Evans, who was a reporter for the Manchester Guardian at the time. Gopčević worked in these years as a war correspondent in the Balkans, and also travelled to Siberia, North America, North Africa and the Middle East. He even had a chance in London to meet William Gladstone in 1879. Gopčević entered the Serbian foreign service and served as diplomatic attaché in Berlin (1886-1887) and Vienna (1887-1890). In 1891 he went back to his family estate in Trieste, where he continued to write as a journalist for several German-language newspapers.

In 1893 Gopčević spent time in jail due to some of his articles against the Austro-Hungarian government, and decided to end his journalistic career. Astronomy became the dominant interest in Gopčević's life and, to a most unusual extent, his work was his life and his life was his work.

In 1893 he founded an observatory "Manora-Sternwarte" in the town of what is now called Mali Lošinj in present-day Croatia. This observatory was named for his wife, a wealthy Austrian noblewoman. At this observatory, Spiridon used the 17.5 cm refractor telescope at the observatory to make observations of Mars, the rings of Saturn, and other planets. However he would eventually close the observatory in 1909 due to financial problems, and the telescope was offered for sale.

From 1899 until 1908 he was the founder and editor of the Astronomische Rundschau, a popular scientific journal. He spent several years in America before returning to Europe and editing an army journal in Berlin during the war. The circumstances of his death are somewhat uncertain, but he appears to have been impoverished.

The crater Brenner on the Moon was named after him (based on his pen name) by his friend Phillip Fauth. A new observatory was built on Mali Lošinj in 1993, and was named “Leo Brenner“.

Controversy 

In 1889, Gopčević published an ethnographic study titled Old Serbia and Macedonia that was a Serbian nationalist book on Kosovo and Macedonia and contained a pro-Serbian ethnographic map of Macedonia. Gopčević's biographer argues that he did not actually go to Kosovo and the study is not based on authentic experiences. Within scholarship Gopčević's study has been noted for its plagiarisms, manipulations and misrepresentations, especially overstressing the Serbian character of Macedonia. Gopčević's views on Serbian and Albanian populations in Kosovo and also the issue of the Arnautaš theory or Albanians of alleged Serbian (descent) have only been partially examined by some authors. Noted for being an ardent Serbian nationalist, his book Old Serbia and Macedonia is seen as a work that opened  the path for unprecedented Serbian territorial claims in the region.

Works
 Montenegro und die Montenegriner, 1877
 Oberalbanien und seine Liga, 1881
 Bulgarien und Ostrumelien, 1886
 Kriegsgeschichtliche Studien, 2 Bände, 1887
 
 (als Leo Brenner): Beobachtungs-Objekte für Amateur-Astronomen, 1902
 USA. Aus dem Dollarlande; Sitten, Zustände und Einrichtungen der Vereinigten Staaten, 1913
 Das Fürstentum Albanien, seine Vergangenheit, ethnographischen Verhältnisse, politische Lage und Aussichten für die Zukunft, 1914
 Geschichte von Montenegro und Albanien, 1914
 Aus dem Lande der unbegrenzten Heuchelei. Englische Zustände, 1915
 Rußland und Serbien von 1804-1915. Nach Urkunden der Geheimarchive von St. Petersburg und Paris und des Wiener Archivs, 1916
 Amerikas Rolle im Weltkriege, 1917
 Die Wahrheit über Jesus nach den ausgegrabenen Aufzeichnungen seines Jugendfreundes, 1920
 Kulturgeschichtliche Studien, 1920
 Österreichs Untergang : die Folge von Franz Josefs Mißregierung, 1920
 Serbokroatisches Gesprächsbuch verbunden mit kurzer Sprachlehre und Wörterverzeichnis, 1920

See also
Serbs in Italy
Triestine Serbs
Arthur Evans
Marino Gopcevich
Spiridione Gopcevich

References

Sources

1855 births
1928 deaths
Serbian astronomers
19th-century astronomers
20th-century astronomers
Writers from Trieste
Scientists from Trieste